Mark A. Rayner is a Canadian author of satire, humour and speculative fiction from London, Ontario.  He is the author of four books: His first novel, The Amadeus Net, was published by ENC Press in New York in 2005 and his second novel, Marvellous Hairy, was published by Crossing Chaos Enigmatic Ink in 2009 (2e Monkeyjoy Press, 2010). His third novel, The Fridgularity (Monkeyjoy Press, 2012.) is a satire of Internet culture and the technological singularity. Pirate Therapy and Other Cures is a collection of humorous, absurd and satirical short fiction, published by Monkeyjoy Press in early 2012. He has also written numerous short stories, including: Hounding Manny [Oceans of the Mind], A Reluctant Emcee [Abyss & Apex] and Any Port in a Storm [Parsec]. He has been nominated for the Prix Aurora Award (for short fiction) three times.

Rayner teaches in the Faculty of Information and Media Studies at The University of Western Ontario. He is a member of The Writers' Union of Canada, SF Canada and is a founding member of The Emily Chesley Reading Circle.

References
Made In Canada Entry
Canadian Books & Authors
SF Canada
The Writer's Union of Canada

External links
The Amadeus Net (ENC Press Website)
The Fridgularity  
Marvellous Hairy  
Pirate Therapy and Other Cures
The Skwib (blog)
Emily Chesley Reading Circle

Canadian science fiction writers
Canadian humorists
Canadian male novelists
Canadian satirists
Living people
Canadian male non-fiction writers
Year of birth missing (living people)